Zoram Nationalist Party is recognized as the state political party in Mizoram, India. The party known as formerly Mizo National Front (Nationalist). It is led by former MP Lalduhoma. MNF(N) was formed in 1997 through a split in the Mizo National Front.

The party won 2 seats in the state assembly in both the 2003 and 2008 state elections. The Zoram National Party has now been merged with Zoram people's movement.

References

External links
 ZNP Official Website - 

Political parties in Mizoram
Political parties established in 1997
Recognised state political parties in India
Political parties disestablished in 2018
2018 disestablishments in India
1997 establishments in Mizoram